The Center for Hellenic Studies (CHS) is a research institute for classics located in Washington, D.C. at 3100 NW Whitehaven Street. It is affiliated with Harvard University.

Nestled in Rock Creek Park behind Embassy Row, the Center for Hellenic Studies offers a variety of both residential and remote fellowships each year to scholars and researchers working on projects in a variety of fields, including "archaeology, art history, epigraphy, history, literary criticism, philology, philosophy, pedagogical applications, reception, and interdisciplinary studies". The center provides housing for "residential" fellows and their families, and accommodates remote fellows and visiting scholars during shorter stays. Fellows are selected by a panel of Senior Fellows, a group of five internationally selected senior classicists. Fellows are typically pre-tenured PhDs from around the world, most often from Europe or North America. The "Center", as it is commonly called, has been a stopping point in the careers of many budding classicists who have gone on to be major contributors in the field.

Director of the center
The director of the center is appointed by Harvard University. Michael C.J. Putnam (Brown University, 1962) was the first director, but acted as a substitute for Bernard Knox (Yale University, 1963–1985), the center's first official director. Knox was succeeded by Zeph Stewart (Harvard University, 1985–1992), and Stewart by co-directors Kurt Raaflaub and Deborah Boedeker (Brown University, 1992–2000). Gregory Nagy became director in 2000 and was succeeded by Mark Schiefsky in 2021.

Campus
The wooded campus has a large mansion as the director's residence, a "stoa" with five apartments for the fellows without families, three cottages for the fellows with families, two subdivided cottages serving as double residences, five guest-rooms to accommodate visiting scholars, and one cottage that has been transformed into a multi-media conference facility.

History
Starting in 2000, director Gregory Nagy brought a new focus on outreach (both national and international), information technology, publishing, and collaborative research to the Center for Hellenic Studies, as evidenced by the center's dynamic website. In 2003, under Nagy's direction, the center began renovations to transform one of the cottages into a new multi-media conference center. The design plans were drawn up by the architectural firm, Convergeo, and in 2006, the "Digital Agora" was unveiled.

CHS Greece
In 2008, the Center for Hellenic Studies opened a campus in Nafplio, Greece.

See also
 American Hellenic Institute
 Hellenic studies

References

External links
 Center for Hellenic Studies
 CHS Greece
 CHS Internships
 Center for Hellenic Studies Facebook Page
 Center for Hellenic Studies Twitter

Ancient Greece studies
Harvard University
Humanities institutes
Research institutes in Washington, D.C.
Research libraries in the United States